William Hoare was a British gymnast. He competed in the men's team event at the 1908 Summer Olympics. He also competed in two diving events at the same Olympics.

References

External links
 

Year of birth missing
Year of death missing
British male artistic gymnasts
British male divers
Olympic gymnasts of Great Britain
Olympic divers of Great Britain
Gymnasts at the 1908 Summer Olympics
Divers at the 1908 Summer Olympics
Place of birth missing